Wesley Ernest Brown (June 22, 1907 – January 23, 2012) was a United States district judge of the United States District Court for the District of Kansas. At his death at age 104, he was the oldest person to serve as a federal judge in the history of the United States, actively hearing cases until approximately one month before his death.

Education and career

Born on June 22, 1907, in Hutchinson, Kansas, to Morrison (Morey) Houston Heady Brown and Julia Elizabeth Wesley Brown, Brown received a Bachelor of Laws in 1933 from the Kansas City School of Law (now the University of Missouri–Kansas City School of Law). He entered private practice in Hutchinson from 1933 to 1944, concurrently serving as county attorney of Reno County, Kansas from 1935 to 1939. He was the secretary of corporation and an attorney for Aircraft Woodwork Manufacturers from 1942 to 1944. He served as a lieutenant in the United States Navy from 1944 to 1946. He returned to private practice in Hutchinson from 1946 to 1958.

Federal judicial service

Bankruptcy court service 
Brown served as a Referee in Bankruptcy for the District of Kansas from 1958 to 1962.

District court service 

Brown was nominated by President John F. Kennedy on March 8, 1962, to a seat on the United States District Court for the District of Kansas vacated by Judge Delmas Carl Hill. He was confirmed by the United States Senate on April 2, 1962, and received his commission on April 4, 1962. He served as Chief Judge from 1971 to 1977 and as a member of the Judicial Conference of the United States from 1976 to 1979. He assumed senior status on September 1, 1979. He served as a Judge of the Temporary Emergency Court of Appeals from 1980 to 1993. His service terminated on January 23, 2012, due to his death at an assisted living facility in Wichita, Kansas. Brown had passed Judge Joseph William Woodrough in August 2011 to become the oldest person to serve as a federal judge in the history of the United States, a distinction he retains as of October 2018. He had continued to hear cases until approximately one month prior to his death, though he discontinued hearing criminal cases in March 2011.

Death
Brown died at the age of 104 in his sleep on January 23, 2012.

See also
 List of United States federal judges by longevity of service

References

External links
 
 Wesley Ernest Brown entry at The Political Graveyard
 

1907 births
2012 deaths
American centenarians
Men centenarians
United States Navy personnel of World War II
Judges of the United States District Court for the District of Kansas
People from Hutchinson, Kansas
United States district court judges appointed by John F. Kennedy
20th-century American judges
United States Navy officers